Émile Lombard may refer to:

Émile Lombard (biblical scholar) (1875–1963), French-Swiss biblical scholar
Émile Lombard (cyclist), Belgian road bicycle racer
Émile Lombard (painter) (1883–?), French painter